Friedrich Richter may refer to: 

Friedrich Adolf Richter (1847–1910), German toy manufacturer
Friedrich-Wilhelm Richter (1911–1989), Waffen-SS officer
Friedrich Richter (officer) (1910–1969), Wehrmacht officer
Friedrich Richter (actor) (1894–1984), German actor